Scattered Dreams: The Kathryn Messenger Story is a 1993 made for TV drama film based on a true story. It stars Gerald McRaney, Ed Grady, Rhoda Griffis, Tyne Daly and Macon McCalman. Actress Alicia Silverstone also stars. It was directed by Neema Bernette.

Plot 
A loving couple trying to make a living in 1951 Florida  is arrested for a crime they didn't commit. The pair is given long jail terms and ripped from their children, so they begin a stunning fight for justice that has them facing the ruthless sheriff responsible for their incarceration.

References

External links 

1993 films
1993 television films
1993 drama films
CBS network films
Films scored by Mark Snow
American films based on actual events
Films set in 1951
Films set in Florida
Films directed by Neema Barnette
1990s English-language films